Andrew Denton's Musical Challenge is an album released by Austereo in 2001 featuring musical challenges posed by radio comedian Andrew Denton to musicians, generally selecting a song in a style in contrast to their own. Following the success of the radio series, the album was released and then a second album followed in 2003, and later a compilation of the greatest of the two was released.

Background
Andrew Denton hosted a morning radio program on Triple M Sydney, entitled Andrew Denton Breakfast Show. The Musical Challenge segment was created with Denton challenging musical guests to perform songs which don't necessarily suit their style, such as Jimmy Barnes singing ABBA's hit "Dancing Queen"  Two CDs of these performances were released on Sony Music with proceeds from the sale going to the Children's Hospital at Westmead.

Volume 1
 "Billie Jean" – Neil Finn (2:54)
 "I Write the Songs" – Mark Lizotte (2:09)
 "Word Up" – Taxiride (2:21)
 "Dancing Queen" – Jimmy Barnes (4:07)
 "Cheap Wine" – Tina Arena (3:34)
 "Lump" – Lee Kernaghan (2:41)
 "Wuthering Heights" James Reyne (2:22)
 "Legs" – Human Nature (2:18)
 "My Heart Will Go On" – The Screaming Jets (3:18)
 "1999" – Shawn Mullins (3:51) 
 "Freak" – Troy Cassar-Daley (3:25)
 "I Touch Myself" – Rolf Harris (2:11)
 "Ben" – Jon Stevens (2:04)
 "Creep" – Gina Jeffreys (3:14)
 "You Got Nothing I Want" – Alex Lloyd (4:25)
 "Gangsta's Paradise" – Richard Clapton (1:32)
 "SOS" – Tonic (3:06)
 "Jump in My Car" – Men at Work (1:46)
 "Down Under" – The Red Army Choir (2:46)
 "Pretty Fly (For a White Guy)" – James Blundell (3:10)
 "It's a Long Way to the Top (If You Wanna Rock 'n' Roll)" – The Wiggles (1:35)
 "Pretty Vacant" – The Delltones (3:13)
 "Nutbush City Limits" – Suzanne Johnston (1:06)
 "Why Don't You Get a Job?" – John Williamson (2:40)
 "Thriller" – Joe Dolce (3:03)
 "Play That Funky Music" – Archie Roach (1:21)

Volume 2: Even More Challenged
 "Sorrow" – Powderfinger (3:07)
 "I Was Made for Lovin' You" – Killing Heidi (2:44)
 "Mysterious Ways" – Alex Lloyd (2:52)
 "When Doves Cry" – Barenaked Ladies (2:31)
 "Kryptonite" – Gina Jeffreys (3:34)
 "You Can't Stop the Music" – The Superjesus (3:21)
 "Genie in a Bottle" – Something for Kate (3:24)
 "Little Red Corvette" – Paul Kelly (3:20)
 "Weir" – David Campbell (3:31)
 "Baby I'm-a Want You" – The Living End (2:19)
 "T.N.T." – Human Nature (1:23)
 "Smells Like Teen Spirit" – Scandal'us (1:20)
 "Jive Talkin"' – Spiderbait (2:12)
 "Sexual Healing" – Neil Finn (3:00)
 "Teenage Dirtbag" – Adam Brand (2:54)
 "Wouldn't It Be Nice" – Lash (1:59)
 "Top of the World" – Stabbing Westward (3:04)
 "Sometimes When We Touch" – Diesel (2:56)
 "I'll Never Fall in Love Again" – Bodyjar (1:52)
 "Una Paloma Blanca" – Zed (2:45)
 "Loving You" – The Cruel Sea (3:53)
 "Eye of the Tiger" – Josh Joplin (3:01)
 "Walk on the Wild Side" – The Wiggles (1:45)
 "Are You Gonna Go My Way" – John Paul Young (2:20)
 "Smoke on the Water" – Mental As Anything (2:38)
 "Morning Train (9 to 5)" – The Angels (2:30)
 "Dirty Deeds" – Kerri-Anne Kennerley (2:35)
 "I'm Like a Bird" – Richard Clapton (2:19)
 "Smells Like Teen Spirit" – Willie Nelson (1:20)

Volume 3: Third Time Lucky!

The New Stuff 
 "Sympathy for the Devil" – Killing Heidi
 "Love Will Keep Us Together" – Nickelback
 "Aussie Medley" – Tenacious D
 "Kiss Kiss" – Bodyjar
 "These Days" – Kasey Chambers
 "It's Raining Men" – Jebediah
 "Murder On The Dancefloor" – One Dollar Short
 "Wake Me Up Before You Go-Go" – Shawn Mullins
 "Not Pretty Enough" – Grinspoon
 "A Little Less Conversation" – Crash Palace
 "The Girl from Ipanema" – Noiseworks
 "Sex Bomb" – The Red Army Choir
 "Enter Sandman" – Mental As Anything
 "Paranoid" – Diesel
 "Working Class Man" – David Campbell
 "Sweet Child o' Mine" – Human Nature
 "Close to You" – Hall & Oates
 "Leaving on a Jet Plane/Jet Airliner" – The Screaming Jets
 "Delilah" – James Reyne
 "Alive" – Bob Downe
 "Physical" – The Cruel Sea
 "Control" – Adam Brand
 "Advance Australian Working Class Man" – Adam Hills

The Classics 
 "Billie Jean" – Neil Finn
 "Dancing Queen" – Jimmy Barnes
 "Cheap Wine" – Tina Arena
 "Lump" – Lee Kernaghan
 "Ben" – Jon Stevens
 "Creep" – Gina Jeffreys
 "You Got Nothing I Want" – Alex Lloyd
 "Smells Like Teen Spirit" – Scandal'us
 "It's a Long Way to the Top (If You Wanna Rock 'n' Roll)" – The Wiggles
 "Nutbush City Limits" – Suzanne Johnston
 "Why Don't You Get a Job?" – John Williamson
 "Sorrow" – Powderfinger
 "You Can't Stop the Music" – The Superjesus
 "Genie in a Bottle" – Something for Kate
 "Little Red Corvette" – Paul Kelly
 "Baby I'm-a Want You" – The Living End
 "Jive Talkin'" – Spiderbait
 "Are You Gonna Go My Way" – John Paul Young
 "I'm Like a Bird" – Richard Clapton
 "Smells Like Teen Spirit" – Willie Nelson

Bonus track 
 "Come as You Are" – Killing Heidi

References

External links

2001 compilation albums
Compilation album series